The Box Plus Network (formerly Video Jukebox Network International Ltd and Box Television Ltd) was a British television company owned by Channel Four Television Corporation, it specialised in music programming.

On 2 April 2013, all The Box Plus Network channels went free-to-air on satellite, apart from 4Music which went free-to-view.

On 8 January 2019, Channel 4 acquired Bauer Media Group's 50% stake in the company to take full ownership of The Box Plus Network. The same year in July, operations of Box Plus moved into Channel 4’s main business operations.

The company was based in Victoria in London.

Current channels

The Box

The Box is well known for its First Play feature, where many videos often make their UK or world première. This new music is often shown through the Box Fresh show on the channel.

Box Africa
In July 2012, Box Television launched a 24-hour pan-African music channel. The channel focuses on international and local music from across the African continent. It is available in 15 countries across Africa. Box Television has also made available its other major channels across Africa.

Kiss

Kiss TV is a commercial music television channel from Box Television available on the Freesat, Sky and Virgin Media digital TV platforms. The playlist covers a wide range of rhythmic music including: urban, grime, electronic, dance, hip hop and R&B, although since its relaunch in Summer 2006, (and the launch of a sister channel Q) it has begun to focus more on dance music once again. It is based on format of the Kiss brand from Bauer which also exists in the Kiss Radio station.

Magic

Magic TV plays mainly easy listening music videos from the 1980s to 2000s and sometimes 1970s as well. It is based on format of the Magic brand from Bauer which exists in the Magic Radio station and Magic branded CDs.

Kerrang!

Kerrang! specialises in Rock Music. As of 2005, all of its programme content is music videos, the majority of which is open scheduled, for text requests from their playlist. It is based on format of Kerrang! brand from Bauer which also exists in Kerrang Radio and Kerrang! magazine.

4Music

4Music is the only Channel 4-branded channel within the Box Plus Network and showcases a range of pop centring on chart hits and current favourites, along with, until 2022, a range of comedy and reality TV programmes from Channel 4 and E4. The channel was formerly available free-to-air on the British digital terrestrial television service Freeview on channel 30. On June 29, 2022, the channel moved to the slot accompanied by Box Hits, while its current slot was used to launch E4 Extra. With this, the channel was fully transitioned back to an all-music schedule.

Defunct channels

Box Hits

Box Hits (formerly Smash Hits) broadcast general mainstream pop music from the past few years. Formally called Smash Hits, it took its name and format of the Smash Hits brand from Bauer which existed in Smash Hits Radio and once ran as a magazine. It shut down on 29 April 2022, and was replaced with 4Music.

The Hits

The Hits closed on 15 August 2008. It was replaced by 4Music. Its sister radio station remains on the air.

Q

Q specialised in indie, rock and alternative. In common with other Box Television channels, Q was originally a jukebox channel, where music video selections made were by the viewers using premium rate phone lines; however this element was dropped in 2004. It is based on format of the Q brand from Bauer which exists in Q Magazine and Q Radio. Q closed on 3 July 2012, when it was replaced by Heat.

Box Upfront

Box Upfront (formerly Heat) was a fresh music channel which launched on 3 July 2012. It formerly took its name and format from Bauer's weekly Heat magazine, and broadcast showbiz news, celebrity features and music videos. It replaced Q on Sky, Smallworld Cable, UPC Ireland, Virgin Media and in Iceland on Síminn. The channel closed on 9 January 2020.

Box Plus App
In 2017, The Box Plus Network launched the Box Plus App, available on Now TV, Roku, EETV, Amazon Fire TV, Xbox, iOS and Android devices. The app was free to use, and included the ability to stream Box Plus Network channels alongside a catch up service.

References

External links

British companies established in 1991
Channel 4
Mass media companies based in London
Music video networks in the United Kingdom